Disturbia, a portmanteau of disturbed and suburbia, may refer to:

 Disturbia (film), a 2007 film starring Shia LaBeouf and its musical works:
 Disturbia: Original Motion Picture Soundtrack
 Disturbia: Original Motion Picture Score
 "Disturbia" (song), a 2008 song by Rihanna
 Disturbia (EP), a 2017 EP by Void of Vision
 Disturbia, a 1997 novel by Christopher Fowler